Window of the World station, formerly Shijiezhichuang station is a station on Line 1 and Line 2 of the Shenzhen Metro. The Line 1 platforms opened on 28 December 2004 and the Line 2 platforms opened on 28 December 2010. It is located underground at the north of Window of the World in Shennan Dadao, Nanshan District, Shenzhen, China. It provides access to two of the theme parks in Shenzhen, Window of the World and Happy Valley.

Station layout

Exits

References

Railway stations in Guangdong
Shenzhen Metro stations
Nanshan District, Shenzhen
Railway stations in China opened in 2004
Railway stations located underground in China